The Division of Denison was an Australian electoral division in Tasmania, before being replaced by the Division of Clark as part of a 2016–17 redistribution.

History

The division was one of the five established when the former Division of Tasmania was redistributed on 2 October 1903 and is named for Sir William Denison, who was Lieutenant Governor of Van Diemen's Land 1847–55. It was located in central Hobart on the western shore of the River Derwent. As at the 2016 election (the last election before being replaced by Clark), it incorporated the area covered by the Cities of Hobart and Glenorchy, together with the northern parts of Kingborough Council, including Taroona, generally north of the Huon Highway. kunanyi / Mount Wellington was a prominent physical feature in the division's west.
Denison was a consistently marginal seat, but was held by the Australian Labor Party between 1987 and 2010 with little difficulty. Its most prominent members were Sir Philip Fysh, a member of the first federal Cabinet; Athol Townley, Minister for Defence in the Menzies Government; and Duncan Kerr, a minister in the Keating, Rudd and Gillard governments. Townley resigned in 1964 when he was named Ambassador to the United States, but he died before taking up the appointment. Another prominent member was independent MP Andrew Wilkie, elected at the 2010 election. Denison has had 16 different members, the second highest (together with Bendigo and Swan, and after Bass's 17)  of any federal electorate.

Members

Election results

References

External links
 Division of Denison – Australian Electoral Commission

Former electoral divisions of Australia
Constituencies established in 1903
Constituencies disestablished in 2019
1903 establishments in Australia
Southern Tasmania
Denison (federal)